Serbia competed at the 2011 World Championships in Athletics from August 27 to September 4 in Daegu, South Korea. A team of seven athletes represented the country in the event. The team was led by 2011 European Athletics U23 Championships
400m hurdles bronze medallist Emir Bekrić, and 2011 European Athletics U23 Championships long jump silver medallist Ivana Španović.  The final team on the entry list comprises the names of 9 athletes.

Results

Men

Decathlon

Women

References

External links
Official local organising committee website
Official IAAF competition website

Nations at the 2011 World Championships in Athletics
World Championships in Athletics
Serbia at the World Championships in Athletics